The Vanuatu Hockey Federation is the governing body of field hockey in Vanuatu, Oceania. Its headquarters were earlier in St. Tusmore, South Australia, Australia, but now have been moved to Port Vila, Vanuatu. It is affiliated to IHF International Hockey Federation and OCF Oceania Hockey Federation.

Peter Robinson is the President of Hockey Association of Vanuatu and Lolyne Kalsrap  is the General Secretary. 

In the International Hockey Federation's 2014 Congress Awards, Vanuatu won the Etienne Glichitch Award. This recognised hockey as the fastest growing sport in Vanuatu, as identified by their Olympic Committee.

History

See also
Oceania Hockey Federation

References

External links
 Vanuatu Hockey - FB
 Vanuatu Hockey shines at the Pacific Games
 More News-Vanuatu Hockey Federation
 Vanuatu Hockey-Sports TG

National members of the Oceania Hockey Federation
Sport in Vanuatu